Sir Edward Phelips Jr. esq of Montacute (1638 – 4 April 1699) was an English landowner and politician who sat in the House of Commons at various times between 1661 and 1699.

Biography

Phelips was the son of Edward Phelips of Montacute House and his wife Anne Pye, daughter of Sir Robert Pye of Faringdon, Berkshire . He was baptised on  26 September 1638. He was a lieutenant of militia horse in Somerset by 1661. In 1661, he was elected Member of Parliament for Ilchester in the Cavalier Parliament. He was commissioner for assessment from 1661 to 1680, joint auditor of excise in 1662, commissioner of corporations from 1662 to 1663 and J.P. from 1662 to February 1688. He was knighted by 24 April 1666 and was lieutenant-colonel of horse in the militia in the same year. In 1675 he was a commissioner for recusants 1675. He was high steward of Ilchester from 1679 to his death and a colonel of militia horse, Somerset between 1679 and 1687. In 1680, he was foreman of the grand jury, and succeeded to Montecute on the death of his father in the same year. He was also steward of crown manors in Somerset from 1680 and Deputy Lieutenant between 1680 and 1687. He was chairman of quarter sessions from 1681 to January 1688. In 1685 he was elected MP for Ilchester again. He was restored to his positions as J.P in October 1688 and Deputy Lieutenant in 1689. He was commissioner for assessment from 1689 to 1690 and became JP again in March 1690. In 1690 he was elected MP for Somerset. He was vice admiral from 1690 to 1696. In 1698 he was elected MP for Somerset again. He died on 4 April 1699 at the age of about 60 and was buried at Montecute.

Family
Phelips married firstly in about 1667, Dorothy Bury, widow of John Bury of Colleton Barton, Chulmleigh, Devon, and daughter of Henry Cheeke of West Newton, North Petherton, Somerset. They had no children and she died on 19 November 1678. He married secondly in about 1683, Edith Blake, daughter of John Blake, ironmonger, of Langport, Somerset and had three daughters: Anne, Elizabeth and Edith.

References

1638 births
1699 deaths
English MPs 1661–1679
English MPs 1685–1687
English MPs 1690–1695
English MPs 1698–1700
Deputy Lieutenants of Somerset